Whiteman may refer to:

Australia
Whiteman, Western Australia
Whiteman Park, in the above suburb

United States
Whiteman Airport, Los Angeles
Whiteman Air Force Base, Missouri
Whiteman Fork, a stream in West Virginia

Other
Whiteman (surname)

See also
White man (disambiguation)
Whitman (disambiguation)
Wightman (disambiguation)
Weightman (disambiguation)